White Lake National Wildlife Refuge is a  National Wildlife Refuge (NWR) in the U.S. state of North Dakota. White Lake NWR is entirely on public land and in a very remote region. The U.S. Fish and Wildlife Service oversees White Lake NWR from their offices at Audubon National Wildlife Refuge.

References

External links
 White Lake National Wildlife Refuge - official site

Protected areas of Slope County, North Dakota
National Wildlife Refuges in North Dakota